White Squall is a 1996 American disaster survival film directed by Ridley Scott. It is a coming of age film in which a group of high school and college-aged teenagers sign up for several months of training aboard a sail ship, a brigantine, and travel around half the globe when suddenly they are challenged by a severe storm. The film stars Jeff Bridges in the role of the captain, called "Skipper", his wife, played by Caroline Goodall, and a supporting cast portraying a group of nearly a dozen student sailors.

The film was based on the 1962 book The Last Voyage of the Albatross by Charles Gieg Jr. and Felix Sutton.

Plot

The film is based on the fate of the brigantine Albatross, which sank 2 May 1961, allegedly because of a white squall. The film relates the ill-fated school sailing trip led by Dr. Christopher B. Sheldon (Jeff Bridges), whom the boys call "Skipper". He is tough and teaches them discipline. He forms a close connection with all-American Chuck Gieg (Scott Wolf), troubled rich kid Frank Beaumont (Jeremy Sisto), shy Gil Martin (Ryan Phillippe) and bad-boy Dean Preston (Eric Michael Cole). On the first days, it is discovered that Gil suffers from acrophobia and does not even try to rescue Chuck, who nearly chokes to death when he becomes entangled in some rigging after slipping from one of the masts. After Chuck is saved by Skipper Sheldon, Gil is ordered to climb the ropes, which he ultimately cannot do, and is assigned to alternative limited duty while on board.

Frank's snobby attitude causes him to bump heads with most of the boys, especially Dean, while Gil opens up to Chuck about his troubled home life one night in their bunks, which Frank listens to and identifies with as well.

After many misadventures on land and on the boat, the boys begin to take Skipper's teachings seriously and begin acting like real shipmates, with Chuck, Frank, Gil and Dean becoming strong friends.

Eventually, the brigantine puts into shore and the boys take their leave on the island. Frank's wealthy father and mother give him a surprise visit while the crew is in port. Frank is upset that the visit seems poorly timed by his overbearing parents, and he becomes separated from the boys and their festivities when his parents require him to go out to steak dinner with them. The father and son end up in a fist fight and become further estranged by the visit and the fight. Frank gets drunk and comes to the party and has to be escorted out by Chuck, Gil and Dean.

After a night of festivities, the crew set out to sea again on the next day. When the brigantine encounters a school of dolphins, Frank, still angry at his father, vents his fury by shooting one of the dolphins with a harpoon. Skipper demands Frank at least put the animal out of its misery, but he can't bring himself to, so Skipper kills it, then tells Frank he's been expelled from the program and puts him ashore at the next port. The day he leaves, Frank apologizes to Skipper for the incident on the boat and is given a farewell by Gil, who gets the courage to climb up the ropes to ring the bell for Frank, which symbolizes ‘Where we go one, we go all’.

Soon after, while at sea, the brigantine encounters a freakish white squall storm. The vessel is battered by the seas, and the boys try to use what the Skipper has taught them in order to survive the horrific ordeal. Most of them succeed in abandoning the vessel, but Gil, Dean, Skipper's wife, and the cook Girard Pascal, all drown.

When the survivors are rescued and reach land, Skipper is put on trial, with Frank's powerful parents leading the call for his license to be revoked. Eventually, the Skipper refuses to allow anyone else to be blamed for the disaster, and accepts responsibility, but his former students all stand up for him, and Frank turns against his bullying parents to support the Skipper, as all of the boys embrace him. The end credits explain that in reality six people died in total (four students) and dedicates the film to them.

Cast
 Jeff Bridges as Captain Christopher "Skipper" Sheldon
 Caroline Goodall as Alice Sheldon
 John Savage as McCrea
 Scott Wolf as Chuck Gieg
 Jeremy Sisto as Frank Beaumont
 Ryan Phillippe as Gil Martin
 Eric Michael Cole as Dean Preston
 Julio Oscar Mechoso as Girard Pascal
 Balthazar Getty as Tod Johnstone
 Jason Marsden as Shay Jennings
 David Lascher as Robert March
 Ethan Embry as Tracy Lapchick
 David Selby as Francis Beaumont
 Jordan Clarke as Charles Gieg, Sr.
 Željko Ivanek as Capt. Sanders
 James Rebhorn as Capt. Tyler
 Jill Larson as Peggy Beaumont
 Lizzy Mackay as Middy Gieg
 Ray De-Haan Stunt Performer

Production
Part of the film was shot using a horizon tank in Malta, with a full-sized mock-up of the ship, the Eye of the Wind, used to depict the Albatross in scenes shot mainly in the Caribbean, on islands such as St. Vincent and the Grenadines. Maurice Jarre was originally scheduled to compose the original score, but was replaced by Hans Zimmer's protégé Jeff Rona. Zimmer was set to replace Jarre but failed to commit due to time difficulties. The song in the end credits is "Valparaiso" by Sting.

Reception
On Rotten Tomatoes the film has an approval rating of 57% based on 37 reviews. The site's consensus states: "Though it gets occasionally bogged down by touchy-feely sentiment, White Squall benefits greatly from Jeff Bridges' assured lead performance and Ridley Scott's visceral, exciting direction". White Squall, like Scott's previous film, 1492: Conquest of Paradise, was a box office disappointment.

Roger Ebert gave it three stars. In his review he said "I enjoyed the movie for the sheer physical exuberance of its adventure."

Home media
Due to the indie nature of White Squall, it has received very patchy releases over the years, through various locally distributed media companies. When the film was first issued on home entertainment formats, VHS was the current standard. Soon after DVD began to gain popularity and White Squall was issued, in North America, via Largo Entertainment, and in the UK and Europe through BMG DVD.
For Blu-ray releases White Squall has been issued as Region-Locked Region 2 in mainlane Europe only, Region 4 in Australia and New Zealand and Region 1 via Kino Lorber in America. A UK pressing has never been available.

References

External links
 
 

1996 drama films
1990s coming-of-age drama films
1990s disaster films
1990s English-language films
1990s teen drama films
American films based on actual events
American coming-of-age drama films
American disaster films
American survival films
American teen drama films
Coming-of-age films based on actual events
Disaster films based on actual events
Drama films based on actual events
Films about animal cruelty
Films about educators
Films about friendship
Films about survivors of seafaring accidents or incidents
Films about the United States Coast Guard
Films directed by Ridley Scott
Films scored by Jeff Rona
Films set in 1961
Films set in the Caribbean
Films set in Connecticut
Films set in Florida
Films shot at Pinewood Studios
Films shot in Savannah, Georgia
Hollywood Pictures films
Largo Entertainment films
Sailing films
Scott Free Productions films
Sea adventure films
Seafaring films based on actual events
1990s American films
QAnon